Shine is the second studio album and major label debut for the Richmond, VA based Pat McGee Band, released on April 11, 2000.

On the heels of successful independent releases in Revel and General Admission, the band inked an album contract with Warner Bros. subsidiary Giant Records. Shine was composed mostly of new material written for the record, though two previously recorded songs were reworked: "Haven't Seen for a While," which originally appeared on McGee's 1996 solo From the Wood, and "Rebecca",  from Wood and Revel.

Singles from the album were "Runaway" and "Rebecca".

Track listing
"Runaway" - 3:57
"Rebecca" - 4:56
"Anybody" - 4:08
"Drivin'" - 4:13
"Haven't Seen for a While" - 5:32
"Hero" - 3:59
"Lost" - 4:24
"Fine" - 4:18
"What Ya Got" - 3:31
"Gibby" - 4:12
"Minute" - 4:09
"I Know" - 6:25
"Shine" - 4:44

There is a hidden track immediately following the conclusion of "Shine" that instrumentally reprises the twelfth track, "I Know".

Personnel
The Pat McGee Band
Pat McGee - lead vocals, guitars
Al Walsh - acoustic guitar
Jonathan Wiliams - keyboards, backing vocals
Chardy McEwan - percussion
Chris Williams - drums
John Small - bass guitar
Brian Fechino - electric guitar on "Hero" and "What Ya Got"
Michael Ghegan - saxophone
Warren Haynes - slide guitar on "Anybody" and "Shine"

2000 albums
Pat McGee Band albums
Albums produced by Jerry Harrison